Léomar Leiria (born 26 June 1971, in Marechal Rondon, Paraná) is a retired Brazilian footballer who played as a defensive midfielder.

Honours
Clube Atlético Paranaense
Campeonato Brasileiro Série B: 1995

Sport Club do Recife
Campeonato Pernambucano: 1997, 1998, 1999, 2000
Copa do Nordeste: 2000

External links
 
 
 
 

1971 births
Living people
Association football midfielders
Brazilian footballers
Brazilian expatriate footballers
Brazil international footballers
Club Athletico Paranaense players
Associação Atlética Iguaçu players
Sport Club do Recife players
Jeonbuk Hyundai Motors players
Clube Náutico Capibaribe players
Centro Sportivo Alagoano players
K League 1 players
Expatriate footballers in South Korea
2001 FIFA Confederations Cup players
Sportspeople from Paraná (state)
Brazilian expatriate sportspeople in South Korea